Actias kongjiaria is a moth in the family Saturniidae. It is found in China.

Subspecies
Actias kongjiaria kongjiaria
Actias kongjiaria shaangxiana Brechlin, 2007 (China: Shaanxi)

References

Kongjiaria
Moths described in 1993
Moths of Asia